The Best Man is a 1998 Italian comedy film written and directed by Pupi Avati. It was entered into the 48th Berlin International Film Festival. The film was selected as the Italian entry for the Best Foreign Language Film at the 70th Academy Awards, but was not accepted as a nominee.

Cast
 Diego Abatantuono as Angelo Beliossi
 Inés Sastre as Francesca Babini
 Dario Cantarelli as Edgardo Osti
 Cinzia Mascoli as Peppina Campeggi
 Valeria D'Obici as Olimpia Campeggi Babini
 Mario Erpichini as Sisto Babini
 Ada Maria Serra Zanetti
 Ugo Conti as Marziano Beliossi
 Nini Salerno as Sauro Ghinassi

See also
 List of submissions to the 70th Academy Awards for Best Foreign Language Film
 List of Italian submissions for the Academy Award for Best Foreign Language Film

References

External links

1998 films
1998 comedy films
Italian comedy films
1990s Italian-language films
Films directed by Pupi Avati
Films set in Italy
Films set in Emilia-Romagna
Films scored by Riz Ortolani
1990s Italian films